"Nothing Can Come Between Us" is a song by English band Sade from their third studio album, Stronger Than Pride (1988). It was released as the album's third single on 5 November 1988, reaching number 92 on the UK Singles Chart and number three on the US Hot R&B/Hip-Hop Songs chart.

Reception
Pan-European magazine Music & Media described "Nothing Can Come Between Us" as "another brooding, percussion-oriented track in a velvety production. Just typical Sade." Frank Guan of Vulture stated, "Truer words have never been sung than 'In the middle of the madness, hold on.' Stuart Matthewman's best impression of funk guitar adds just the right amount of spice to the duet."

Track listings
7-inch single
A. "Nothing Can Come Between Us" – 3:55
B. "Make Some Room" – 3:24

12-inch single
A. "Nothing Can Come Between Us" – 4:21
B. "Make Some Room" (extended version) – 5:00

UK limited-edition gatefold 12-inch single
A. "Nothing Can Come Between Us" – 4:21
B1. "Make Some Room" (extended version) – 5:00
B2. "You're Not the Man" – 5:09

UK CD single
"Nothing Can Come Between Us" – 4:21
"Make Some Room" (extended version) – 5:00
"You're Not the Man" – 5:09

US cassette single
"Nothing Can Come Between Us"
"Make Some Room"

Charts

Weekly charts

Year-end charts

References

1988 singles
1988 songs
Black-and-white music videos
Epic Records singles
Music videos directed by Sophie Muller
Sade (band) songs
Song recordings produced by Mike Pela
Songs written by Sade (singer)
Songs written by Stuart Matthewman